The Fool (later The Fool...Plus on a 1998 CD reissue) is a 1968 psychedelic folk album by Dutch design collective The Fool, produced by Graham Nash.

References

1968 albums
The Fool (design collective) albums